The 2022 United States Senate election in New York was held on November 8, 2022, to elect a member of the United States Senate to represent the State of New York.

Incumbent four-term Democratic Party Senator Chuck Schumer, who has served as Senate Majority Leader since 2021 and has held New York's Class 3 Senate seat since defeating Republican Party incumbent Al D'Amato in 1998, ran for a fifth term. Republican Party challenger Joe Pinion is the first black Senate nominee of any major party in New York history. The filing deadline for the June primary was April 7, 2022. Schumer became the longest-serving U.S. senator in the state's history once his fifth term began in the 118th Congress.

Though Schumer was comfortably re-elected, he lost significant support on Long Island and Upstate New York compared to his last election in 2016. Pinion flipped the more conservative counties that Schumer had won in his previous runs, as well as some Democratic leaning counties such as Nassau, Saratoga, Broome, Clinton, and Essex. However, Schumer's lead was large enough in New York City that it was called by most media outlets the moment the polls closed.

Despite Democrats overperforming expectations on a national level during this cycle, this race was the most competitive in Schumer's Senate career since his first election in 1998, when he won by 10.5%.

Democratic primary

Candidates

Nominee
Chuck Schumer, incumbent U.S. Senator and Senate Majority Leader

Disqualified 
 Moses Mugulusi, regulator
 Khaled Salem, activist

Declined 
Alessandra Biaggi, state senator from the 34th district (ran for U.S. House)
Andrew Cuomo, former Governor of New York, former Attorney General of New York, and former U.S. Secretary of Housing and Urban Development
Jumaane Williams, New York City Public Advocate and former New York City Councilor for the 45th district (ran for governor)

Endorsements

Polling

Republican primary
At the 2022 New York State Republican Convention, Joe Pinion was designated as the New York State Republican Party’s preferred candidate for U.S. Senate. Pinion  became the first Black individual to be backed by a major party in a U.S. Senate election in New York.

Candidates

Nominee
 Joe Pinion, entrepreneur, TV host and candidate for New York State Assembly in 2018

Disqualified
Aleksander Mici, lawyer and candidate for New York City Council in 2021

Declined
 Andrew Giuliani, former Trump administration official, son of Rudy Giuliani and Newsmax TV contributor (ran for governor)
 John Katko, U.S. Representative for 
 Tom Reed, former U.S. Representative for 

Endorsements

Conservative primary

Candidates

Nominee
 Joe Pinion, TV host and candidate for New York State Assembly in 2018

Working Families primary

Candidates

Nominee
 Chuck Schumer, incumbent U.S. senator

Other candidates 
Diane Sare ran on an Independent ballot line labeled "LaRouche."

General election

Predictions

Endorsements

Polling 
Aggregate polls

Graphical summary

Chuck Schumer vs. generic opponent

Results

Counties that flipped from Democratic to Republican

By congressional district
Schumer won 19 of 26 congressional districts, including four that elected Republicans.

See also 
 2022 United States Senate elections

Notes

Partisan clients

References

External links 
Official campaign websites
 Joe Pinion (R) for Senate
 Chuck Schumer (D) for Senate 
 Diane Sare (LaRouche) for Senate

2022
New York
United States Senate